Katreus  is a genus of skippers in the family Hesperiidae.

Species
The following species are recognised in the genus Katreus:
 Katreus dimidia (Holland, 1896)
 Katreus holocausta (Mabille, 1891)
 Katreus johnstonii (Butler, 1888) - giant scarce sprite

References

External links

Natural History Museum Lepidoptera genus database

Hesperiidae
Hesperiidae genera